The Thumb is a  mountain summit located on the crest of the Sierra Nevada mountain range, in Inyo County of northern California. It is situated in the Palisades area of the John Muir Wilderness, on land managed by Inyo National Forest. The Thumb ranks as the 83rd-highest summit in California. The John Muir Trail traverses below the southwest aspect of the mountain, providing an optional approach access.

History
The first ascent of the summit was made December 12, 1921, by Windsor B. Putnam via the southeast slope and an approach from Birch Creek. This mountain's name was submitted for consideration by Windsor B. Putnam, and officially adopted in 1926 by the U.S. Board on Geographic Names. This peak has in the past been called "East Palisade" and "Thumb Peak".

Climate
The Thumb has an alpine climate which supports the Middle Palisade Glacier below the western cliffs. Most weather fronts originate in the Pacific Ocean, and travel east toward the Sierra Nevada mountains. As fronts approach, they are forced upward by the peaks, causing them to drop their moisture in the form of rain or snowfall onto the range (orographic lift). Precipitation runoff from this mountain drains to Owens Valley via Big Pine and Birch Creeks.

Gallery

See also

 List of the major 4000-meter summits of California

References

External links

 Windsor B. Putnam's account of naming and climbing The Thumb: Sierra Club Bulletin
 Weather forecast: The Thumb

Inyo National Forest
Mountains of Inyo County, California
Mountains of the John Muir Wilderness
North American 3000 m summits
Mountains of Northern California
Sierra Nevada (United States)